Goddard is an unincorporated community and former census-designated place (CDP) in Prince George's County, Maryland, United States. It was named after the physicist Robert H. Goddard. The population was 5,554 in the 2000 census. The area was no longer a census-designated place as of the 2010 census.

Geography
Goddard is located at  (38.986389, −76.852932).

Demographics

As of the census of 2000, there were 5,554 people, 2,097 households, and 1,348 families residing in the CDP. The racial makeup of the CDP was 29.94% White, 53.31% African American, 0.41% Native American, 11.69% Asian, 0.07% Pacific Islander, 1.51% from other races, and 3.06% from two or more races. Hispanic or Latino of any race were 3.13% of the population.

There were 2,097 households, out of which 32.0% had children under the age of 18 living with them, 42.3% were married couples living together, 18.1% had a female householder with no husband present, and 35.7% were non-families. 26.9% of all households were made up of individuals, and 3.4% had someone living alone who was 65 years of age or older. The average household size was 2.57 and the average family size was 3.18.

In the CDP, the population was spread out, with 23.2% under the age of 18, 9.9% from 18 to 24, 33.4% from 25 to 44, 24.4% from 45 to 64, and 9.1% who were 65 years of age or older. The median age was 35 years. For every 100 females, there were 84.6 males. For every 100 females age 18 and over, there were 80.5 males.

The median income for a household in the CDP was $57,482, and the median income for a family was $67,000. Males had a median income of $37,253 versus $36,170 for females. The per capita income for the CDP was $25,710. About 1.7% of families and 4.2% of the population were below the poverty line, including 5.5% of those under age 18 and 5.5% of those age 65 or over.

Government and infrastructure
NASA’s Goddard Space Flight Center is partially located in the former CDP.

Education
The former Goddard CDP is within Prince George's County Public Schools.

Catherine T. Reed and Magnolia elementary schools serve sections of the former CDP.

The former CDP is divided between Thomas Johnson Middle School and Greenbelt Middle School.

The former CDP is divided between DuVal High School and Eleanor Roosevelt High School.

References

Unincorporated communities in Prince George's County, Maryland
Former census-designated places in Maryland
Unincorporated communities in Maryland